Boynton Beach is a city in Palm Beach County, Florida, United States. It is situated about 57 miles north of Miami. The population was 80,380 at the 2020 census. Boynton Beach is a principal city of the Miami metropolitan area, which was home to 6,138,333 people at the 2020 census.

History

See also William S. Linton

In 1894, two years before Henry Morrison Flagler built his railroad, a former American Civil War major named Nathan Boynton first set eyes on the area that now bears his name. Boynton hailed from Port Huron, Michigan. He was so impressed by the natural beauty of the year-round sunshine and pristine beaches, he built the famous Boynton Hotel, where he also spent winters with his family. The first settlers, whom Boynton had brought along from Michigan, soon realized that many fruits and vegetables thrived in the fertile climate.  Pineapples, tomatoes, mangoes, and citrus fruit were packed in crates and shipped by the ton on the newly built Florida East Coast Railroad to satisfy the appetites of hungry Americans across the country. Major Boynton died on May 27, 1911 in Port Huron, but the hotel lasted until 1925.

Boynton Beach was founded on September 26, 1898 when Byrd Spilman Dewey and her husband Fred S. Dewey filed the original plat in the Dade County courthouse for the Town of Boynton. The town was incorporated in 1920 as the Town of Boynton. The name "Boynton Beach" was first used by a community that broke off from the Town of Boynton in 1931. In 1939, that community changed its name to "Ocean Ridge" while The Town of Boynton took the name "Boynton Beach" in 1941.

In 1926, the Seaboard Air Line Railway entered what was then simply Boynton, spurring land development a mile inland near the Seaboard station, including the town's first planned subdivision, Lake Boynton Estates. As land became more valuable, areas along the Intracoastal Waterway and the Federal Highway in Boynton also saw housing developments. To the west, many dairies were founded so that the Boynton area became the main milk supplier for Palm Beach County. By the 1970s, the dairies were no longer profitable and these lands too were converted to housing developments.

Boynton Beach Oceanfront Park is located just north of the original Boynton Hotel site. In 1921, the Town of Boynton acquired the beach site from Lewis S. Howe by eminent domain for park and recreation purposes. The beach casino was built in 1928 and featured a large dining hall, locker rooms and showers and residents used the casino for parties and social gatherings. The casino was demolished in 1967 and the property remained part of the beach park.

From the 1920s to today, Boynton Beach Oceanfront Park has been popular with residents and visitors alike. In the mid-1990s, the park underwent a major renovation during which the boardwalk was rebuilt out of recycled plastic. Boynton Beach's Oceanfront Park was voted the best family beach in Palm Beach County by The Palm Beach Post in 2001. In 2011 the boardwalk was renovated again, replacing the plastic with ipe (pronounced ee-pay) wood (commonly known as Brazilian walnut). In 2012 improvements were made to the buildings along the boardwalk, including total refurbishment of the restrooms.

Hurricane Wilma struck Boynton Beach on October 24, 2005, causing widespread damage to homes and businesses. In 2006, the city government authorized the demolition of the historic Seaboard rail station, which had survived intact in private hands since passenger service to the station halted in 1971.

On March 8 2022, Ty Penserga was elected mayor of Boynton Beach in Florida, making him the first openly gay mayor of the city as well as the first out LGBTQ Asian American mayor elected in Florida state history. A high school biology and chemistry teacher, Penserga was sworn into office by State Attorney Dave Aronberg.

Crime 

2006 saw an increase in gang-related violent crime. This mirrored a similar increase across Palm Beach County. A gang-related shooting that resulted in a death at the city's popular Boynton Beach Mall on Christmas Eve of 2006 caught the national attention on many news networks, such as CBS. There were ten known operating gangs in the city as of 2007, according to police, including the notorious South Florida Haitian Zoe Pound gang. As of 2009, countywide gang violence had fallen three percent.

On January 27, 2012, Mayor Jose Rodriguez was suspended from office by the state governor for trying to influence a police investigation into his personal affairs.

The crime rate started decreasing in 2017 and hit its lowest number in 20 years in 2020.  According to the Florida Department of Law Enforcement's 2020 Annual Crime Report, the total crime rate decreased by 28 percent in the city compared to 2019 and 64 percent compared to 2001. Violent crime, which includes murder, rape, robbery and aggravated assault, decreased 8.5 percent. Property crime, which includes burglary, larceny and motor vehicle theft, dropped by 32.2 percent. Florida’s total crime volume dropped 14.1 percent compared to 2019.

Boynton Beach Police Chief Michael G. Gregory attributed the decrease to focused efforts, an all-hands-on-deck approach and "using a multitude of tactics and crime fighting strategies that are constantly evolving based on crime patterns".

Demographics

2020 census

As of the 2020 United States census, there were 80,380 people, 31,863 households, and 17,482 families residing in the city.

2010 census

As of 2010, there were 36,289 households, out of which 19.8% were vacant. As of 2000, 22.2% had children under the age of 18 living with them, 45.4% were married couples living together, 10.9% had a female householder with no husband present, and 40.2% were non-families. 33.0% of all households were made up of individuals, and 17.8% had someone living alone who was 65 years of age or older. The average household size was 2.26 and the average family size was 2.87.

2000 census
In 2000, the city's population was spread out, with 19.9% under the age of 18, 6.4% from 18 to 24, 28.1% from 25 to 44, 19.8% from 45 to 64, and 25.8% who were 65 years of age or older. The median age was 42 years. For every 100 females, there were 87.9 males. For every 100 females age 18 and over, there were 84.5 males.

In 2021 the median income was $73,083.

In 2000, the median income for a household in the city was $39,845, and the median income for a family was $47,546. Males had a median income of $32,503 versus $26,399 for females. The per capita income for the city was $22,573. About 7.4% of families and 10.2% of the population were below the poverty line, including 17.9% of those under age 18 and 7.2% of those age 65 or over.

In 2000, native speakers of English accounted for 80.09% of all residents, while speakers of French Creole comprised 7.51%, Spanish was at 7.30%, French consisted of 1.02%, Italian at 0.97%, and German made up 0.87% of the population.

Schools

Like all of Palm Beach County, Boynton Beach is served by the School District of Palm Beach County.  As of 2006, it was the fifth largest school district in Florida and the twelfth largest school district in the United States.

Elementary schools:
 Citrus Cove Elementary School
 Crosspointe Elementary School
 Crystal Lakes Elementary School
 Forest Park Elementary
 Manatee Elementary School
 Freedom Shores Elementary School
 Galaxy Elementary School
 Hagen Road Elementary School
 Poinciana Elementary School (magnet school for math, science and technology)
 Rolling Green Elementary School
 Sunset Palms Elementary School

Middle schools:
 Christa McAuliffe Middle School
 Congress Middle School
Somerset Academy Canyons Middle School

High schools:
 Boynton Beach Community High School
 Park Vista Community High School
Somerset Academy Canyons High School
 South Tech Academy Charter High School

Public transportation

Boynton Beach is served by a Tri-Rail station of the same name linking Boynton Beach to West Palm Beach to the north and Miami to the south. It is also serviced by local buses provided by PalmTran.

Controversy
Boynton Beach commissioned a mural showing three of its firefighters, unveiled in 2020, for a window covering at a new fire station.  The mural depicted former fire chief Glenn Joseph, and former deputy fire chief Latosha Clemons, both of whom are Black.  Clemons was the city's first Black female fire fighter. The mural depicted both of them as white, and Clemons sued the city for defamation, libel and negligence.  The city has since removed the mural and settled the lawsuit.

Notable people

 Ramon Perez Blackburn, actor-singer-dance
 Danielle Bregoli, rapper, social media personality
 Marlon Byrd, MLB outfielder for the Cleveland Indians
 Jeremy Cain, NFL long snapper for the Jacksonville Jaguars
 Noah Centineo, actor
 Charles Cornelius, NFL and CFL player
 Byrd Spilman Dewey, author and town of Boynton co-founder
 Craig Erickson, NFL retired quarterback, played for Tampa Bay Buccaneers and Philadelphia Eagles, and in college for Miami 1987–1990
 Johnny Farrell, golfer, 1928 U.S. Open champion
 Brandon Fletcher (born 1987), Internet entrepreneur
 James J. Greco, businessman, lived in town 2011-2016
 Jayron Hosley, NFL cornerback for the New York Giants
 Lamar Jackson, NFL quarterback for the Baltimore Ravens
 Ryan Klesko, MLB player
 Sean Labanowski (born 1992), Israeli-American basketball player in the Israeli National League
 Dov Markus (born 1946), Israeli-American soccer player
 Vincent Mason, rapper, producer, DJ, and one third of hip hop trio De La Soul
 Hilary McRae, singer, songwriter
 Tristan Nunez, racing driver
 Titus O'Neil, professional wrestler
 Harvey Eugene Oyer III, attorney and author
 Charlie W. Pierce, Florida pioneer and author
 Otis Thorpe, NBA basketball player
 Trea Turner, MLB Player
 Howard E. Wasdin, sniper in Navy SEAL Team Six
 Vince Wilfork, former NFL nose tackle
 Mark Worrell, MLB Player
 Danny Young, MLB player

See also
 Church of Our Savior, MCC
 Schoolhouse Children's Museum & Learning Center

References

External links

 City of Boynton Beach
 Greater Boynton Beach Chamber of Commerce
 Boynton Beach Historical Society
 Green Cay Wetlands

 
Cities in Florida
Cities in Palm Beach County, Florida
Populated coastal places in Florida on the Atlantic Ocean
Populated places established in 1894
Beaches of Palm Beach County, Florida
Beaches of Florida
1894 establishments in Florida